New Lexington is an unincorporated community in Perry County, in the U.S. state of Ohio.

History
New Lexington was laid out and platted in 1805, making it the oldest existing settlement in Preble County. The community was named after Lexington, Kentucky, the native home of a first settler, James Irwin Nisbet (1777-1830), who executed the original survey.

References

Unincorporated communities in Preble County, Ohio
Unincorporated communities in Ohio